Forest Park Elementary School can refer to the following schools:

Forest Park Elementary School (Arkansas), in Little Rock
Forest Park Elementary School (California), in Fremont
Forest Park Elementary School (Ohio), in the Forest Park neighborhood of Columbus